The Ambassador of Malaysia to the Democratic People's Republic of Korea is the head of Malaysia's diplomatic mission to North Korea. The position has the rank and status of an Ambassador Extraordinary and Plenipotentiary and is based in the Embassy of Malaysia, Pyongyang.

List of heads of mission

Ambassadors to North Korea

See also
 Malaysia–North Korea relations

References 

 
North Korea
Malaysia